Khidistavi is a village in the Chokhatauri Municipality of Guria in western Georgia.

See also
 Guria

References

Populated places in Guria